Irakli Chirikashvili (born 10 January 1987) is a Georgian former footballer who played as a midfielder.

Career
Chirikashvili signed for Neuchâtel Xamax in the Swiss Super League for the 2001-12 season after a 10-day trial. He made his professional debut for on 31 July 2011, coming on as a substitute for Bastien Geiger in the away match against Sion, which finished as a 0–3 home loss. After suffering an injury upon arrival, he asked to go on loan to the Swiss second division which never happened.

References

External links
 
 
 

1987 births
Living people
Footballers from Georgia (country)
Georgia (country) youth international footballers
Georgia (country) under-21 international footballers
Expatriate footballers from Georgia (country)
Expatriate sportspeople from Georgia (country) in Switzerland
Expatriate footballers in Switzerland
Association football midfielders
FC Dinamo Tbilisi players
FC Spartaki Tskhinvali players
FC Lokomotivi Tbilisi players
FC Sioni Bolnisi players
Neuchâtel Xamax FCS players
FC Zestafoni players
FC Dinamo Batumi players
Erovnuli Liga players
Swiss Super League players